Giovanna "Gi" Fernandes Silva (born 23 December 2004) is a Brazilian professional footballer who plays as either a right back or a midfielder for Santos.

Club career
Born in Praia Grande, São Paulo, Gi Fernandes joined Santos' youth setup in 2018. Promoted to the first team in July 2020, she made her first team debut on 27 September, starting in a 6–0 Campeonato Brasileiro Série A1 home routing of Ponte Preta; aged just 15, she became the youngest player ever to debut for Sereias da Vila, and the second-youngest in Santos' history overall, only behind Coutinho.

On 10 December 2021, Gi Fernandes signed her first professional contract with Santos.

Honours

Club
Santos
: 2020

International
Brazil U20
South American Under-20 Women's Football Championship: 2022

References

2004 births
Living people
Footballers from São Paulo (state)
Brazilian women's footballers
Women's association football midfielders
Campeonato Brasileiro de Futebol Feminino Série A1 players
Santos FC (women) players
People from Praia Grande